George A. Bonanno is a professor of clinical psychology at Teachers College, Columbia University, U.S. He is responsible for introducing the controversial idea of resilience to the study of loss and trauma. He is known as a pioneering researcher in the field of bereavement and trauma. The New York Times on February 15, 2011, stated that the current science of bereavement has been "driven primarily" by Bonanno. Scientific American summarized a main finding of his work, "The ability to rebound remains the norm throughout adult life." In 2019, Bonanno was honored with the James McKeen Cattell award from the Association of Psychological Science "for a lifetime of intellectual achievements in applied psychological research and their impact on a critical problem in society at large" and by the International Positive Psychology Association for "distinguished lifetime contributions to positive psychology".

Contributions to the field
Bonanno's contributions to the field are summarized in his books, The Other Side of Sadness: What the New Science of Bereavement Tells Us About Life After a Loss, and The End of Trauma: How the New Science of Resilience is Changing How We Think About PTSD.

His contributions include the following:

 Introducing rigorous and innovative scientific methods, including the use of prospective research designs based on data before and after a major life event, to the field of bereavement and trauma;
The idea that outcomes following loss or potential trauma are more variable, or "heterogeneous", than suggested by traditional conceptions of PTSD or complicated grief.
Demonstrating that outcome heterogeneity following loss or potential trauma can be captured by a relatively small set of prototypical outcome patterns or "trajectories".
Demonstrating that resilience, defined as a stable trajectory of mental and physical health, is the most common, natural outcome to loss or trauma.
 Replacing with scientific findings the major concepts of grief that are theoretical, unsupported scientifically, but remain popular among practitioners and the lay public today, such as Kübler-Ross model of the stages of grief and the idea of grief work based on Freud's ideas;
 Using research evidence to argue that some practices common in grief counseling, trauma counseling, and among therapists after potentially traumatic events can be harmful. These practices include pressuring people to talk about a loss or potential trauma or to participate in therapy after these events regardless of their level of functioning. These practices are common parts of public policy and are based on the underlying assumption that people are not resilient;
 Showing that genuine laughter and smiling is a healthy response to a loss or stressor event; is protective;
 Coining the phrase "coping ugly" to describe the idea that coping with extreme life events takes many forms, some of which seem counter intuitive.
Identifying the "resilience paradox" by noting that correlates of resilience typically exert such small effects that, paradoxically, it is not possible to accurately predict who will be resilient and who not after a major life stressor
Introducing the concept of regulatory flexibility  and showing how its primary components, the flexibility mindset and the flexibility sequence, help solve the resilience paradox
 Because resilience is natural, suggesting that it cannot be "taught" through specialized programs and that there is virtually no existing research to design resilience training nor is there existing research to support major investment in such things as military resilience training programs;

Resilience
Bonanno's research found psychological resilience to be at the core of human grief and trauma reactions. Bonanno's finding of resilience overturns what has been the status quo assumption of a person's experience of grief and trauma in the West since Sigmund Freud nearly a century ago. Bonanno's contribution to the field is to have found resilience through rigorous research and not through anecdotal evidence, theorizing, or simple but unreliable methodology.

Many in the field of bereavement and trauma have found Bonanno's finding of persistent resilience in the face of potentially traumatic events controversial. Many therapists and psychiatrists, who tend to treat the chronically affected, find it hard to imagine that no treatment is needed for most people who have experienced a loss or even an extreme stressor event, such as during 9/11 or childhood sexual abuse. Further, in contrast to Freud's and his followers' ideas and prevailing popular theories, it is difficult for many people to accept laughter as a healthy response. Another difficult concept, especially in the face a potentially traumatic event when people feel pulled to help in some way, is to realize that offering treatment to otherwise well people can cause harm, by producing the symptoms they hope to avoid.

Other critics have claimed the opposite, that far from being misguided, the idea that humans are resilient is so obvious that it is simplistic. Others have countered that it may seem simple, but the idea has escaped researchers for the century between Freud's work and Bonanno's. Policy and treatment for the past century has relied on the false idea that humans are not resilient, a costly mistake in human and monetary terms.

That people are resilient even when facing extreme stressors or losses contradicts the stages model of grief. Many resilient people show no grief. They therefore have no stages of grief to pass through. Until Bonanno, therapists and psychiatrists considered the absence of grief a pathology to be feared, rather than a healthy outcome. Resilience has profound implications for people's concepts of themselves, especially after suffering a severe stressor event. The idea also has important implications for how the therapeutic community views loss and trauma. Bonanno has argued that universal counseling after potentially traumatic events does more harm than good, a point eventually verified by convincing research. Resilience being an inherent part of human experience after major stressor events also may have important implications for public policy, such as how to best treat veterans who have served in war situations and whether to counsel large populations after major stressor events, such as tsunamis or mass shootings.

Trajectories of grief and trauma reactions
In 2002 and 2004, Bonanno described the most common trajectories of grief or potential trauma. This research was based on prospective data collected both prior to the loss or trauma and afterwards. In subsequent studies, Bonanno and colleagues identified the same trajectories following other potentially traumatic events, such as the September 11 terrorist attack in New York, combat deployment, and myriad other events. Contrary to common assumptions about loss and trauma, Bonanno's research may indicate that resilience is the most common pattern and that delayed reactions are rare.

The most common or prototypical trajectories are as follows:
 Resilience "The ability of adults in otherwise normal circumstances who are exposed to an isolated and potentially highly disruptive event, such as the death of a close relation or a violent or life-threatening situation, to maintain relatively stable, healthy levels of psychological and physical functioning" as well as "the capacity for generative experiences and positive emotions".
 Recovery When "normal functioning temporarily gives way to threshold or sub-threshold psychopathology (e.g., symptoms of depression or Posttraumatic Stress Disorder (PTSD)), usually for a period of at least several months, and then gradually returns to pre-event levels."
 Chronic dysfunction Prolonged suffering and inability to function, usually lasting several years or longer.
 Delayed grief or trauma When adjustment seems normal but then distress and symptoms increase months later. Researchers have not found evidence of delayed grief, but delayed trauma appears to be a genuine phenomenon.

Coping ugly
Bonanno coined the phrase "coping ugly" to describe his finding that grief and coping with grief take many forms. Behaviors that may not be healthy ordinarily may be helpful in times of stress, such as self-serving biases.

Scientific study of grief
Before Bonanno's work, a prevailing idea was that grief cannot be quantified or studied in a scientifically meaningful way. Bonanno forcefully argued early that scientific study of grief was possible.

The attitude of the field before Bonanno could be summarized by Tom Golden, a prominent bereavement expert who specializes in male grief. He said in 1997, "People who are grieving think that researchers are full of crap—and part of me says, I'm with you. We don't have the tools to measure it yet, there's no grieve-o-meter. We need to develop a sense of not knowing."

"I think that's a ridiculous statement", Bonanno said, heatedly, in 1997 in response to Tom Golden's remark. "You can measure grief. People want to take a magical, mystical perspective, but it's very dangerous to assume that they have access to a sacred realm that research can't touch, relying only on their own observations, feelings, and thoughts—things that are very unreliable." This sort of clinical criticism, he argued, is the result of a simplistic attachment to individual patients' life stories. "The criticism I most often hear is, 'Your research is very bad, because I have a patient who feels such and such.' I've studied hundreds of people."

Innovations in trauma research methodology
Bonanno conducted multi-cultural research into grief and trauma, including studies in Nanjing, China; among war survivors in Bosnia-Herzegovina; and in trauma-exposed people in Israel and elsewhere. He has done multi-dimensional studies of emotion regulation, stressful life events, resilience, and adjustment among college students; survivors of childhood sexual abuse (in collaboration with researchers at NIH); survivors of the September 11 terrorist attacks in New York City, and many other events.

Recognizing that any single simple measure cannot fully capture a phenomenon, a hallmark of Bonanno's research methodology has relied on several independent measures simultaneously. This ensures convergent validity of any findings. For example, his research studies often simultaneously use, among other measures, skin temperature, heart rate, facial expressions of emotion, empty chair studies, longitudinal measures over months or years, cortisol, genetic factors, physician and friend reports, and experimental tasks.

Flexible self-regulation 
Bonanno observed that coping and emotion regulation strategies were commonly viewed as being either consistently adaptive or consistently maladaptive. For example, emotional expression is generally thought to be adaptive while the suppression of emotional expression is generally thought to be a maladaptive strategy. In 2004, Bonanno countered this idea by demonstrating that “whether one expresses or suppresses emotional expression is not as important for adjustment as is the ability to flexibly express or suppress emotional expression as demanded by the situational context.” Based on this and subsequent research, Bonanno and Charles Burton described that the belief that any single behavior or strategy is consistently adaptive (or maladaptive) an example of the fallacy of uniform efficacy. They also proposed that flexible regulation is not a single behavior or skill but rather consists of several abilities that unfold in sequence, later dubbed the flexibility sequence. The primary steps in the sequence involve (1) context sensitivity, the ability to read cues to the demands and challenges of specific situations; (2) repertoire, having a set of strategies that one is able to use effectively; and (3) feedback monitoring, the ability to monitor and modify a chosen strategy as needed. In addition, Bonanno later proposed that certain personality features foster flexibility by creating a motivational background he called the flexibility mindset.

The resilience paradox 
Although numerous correlates of resilient outcomes have been reported, the statistical effects of these correlates are nearly uniformly modest. As a result, it is paradoxically difficult to predict with accuracy who will be resilient and who not. Bonanno dubbed this the resilience paradox. Possible means of addressing the resilience paradox include personality scales that capture key correlates and advanced computational methods, such as machine learning algorithms, that capture multiple diverse correlates. However, neither approach solves the paradox. Bonanno proposed that any solution to the paradox must account for both situational variability and the cost-benefit tradeoffs inherent in all behavioral responses, and further that these factors can be accommodated by the concept of flexible self-regulation.

Criticism
James W. Pennebaker's findings, very well supported by data, directly contradict Bonanno's claims on the harmful effects of retrieving bad experiences. One possible explanation and attempt to reconcile this seeming contradiction is the method for retrieving or reviewing bad memories. Pennabaker is known for his pioneering work in writing therapy. It may be that there's something about writing, rather than expressively crying in public, for one example, that helps rather than hurts a person's outcome. Writing may help preserve social bonds, which are crucial to maintain for good outcomes after a loss.

Personal life
George Bonanno lives in New York City and Woodstock, NY, with his wife, Paulette Roberts, and their two children.

References

External links
 Lingua Franca:  by Emily Nussbaum "Good Grief!" 
 Globe and Mail: "Catastrophic loss, and the resilience of the human psyche" (Japanese earthquake, tsunami, nuclear disasters)
 Scientific American: "The Neuroscience of True Grit"
 Time: "New Ways to Think About Grief"
 New York Times: "Resilience, Not Misery, in Coping with Death"
 New York Times: op-ed "Grief, Unedited"
 New York Times Magazine: "Repress Yourself"
 The New Yorker: by Malcolm Gladwell "Getting Over It"
 Project Rebirth video: Using Project "Rebirth in a Clinical Psychology Course on Loss and Trauma"
 Video: "George Bonanno on the Value of Grief and Grieving"
 New York Times: by Jane Brody "Often, Time Beats Therapy for Treating Grief"
 New York Times: "After a Death, the Pain That Doesn't Go Away"
 New York Times: Bonanno's Four Trajectories of Grief "Down and Out or Up"
 Psychology Today: "Can Therapy Make You Worse?"
 Psychology Today: "Spousal Resilience"
 Psychology Today: "Bouncing Back"
 Science News: "Good Grief: Bereaved Adjust Well Without Airing Emotion"
 New York Newsday: "Youtube, Facebook Memorials Help People Cope"
 Los Angeles Times: "Bonding with a mate changes brain chemistry, researchers find"
 "Smiling and Laughter in the Face of Terrorist Attacks is Beneficial"
 "Smiling and Laughter Must Be Genuine to Aid Coping with Grief"
 Financial Times: "Coping after a Tsunami"
 Washington Post: "From Wounds, Inner Strength"
 Boston Globe: "Inner strength: Between 5% and 30% of Hurricane Katrina victims are expected to suffer longterm emotional damage, but the majority will recover"
 Forskning.no: Norwegian coverage of Bonanno's work 
 ScienceDaily: "Why Cry? Evolutionary Biologists Show Crying Can Strengthen Relationships"

Living people
Columbia University faculty
Teachers College, Columbia University faculty
Hampshire College alumni
Yale University alumni
People from Chicago
Year of birth missing (living people)
American clinical psychologists